Éva Dónusz (born September 29, 1967) is a Hungarian sprint canoer who competed from the late 1980s to the late 1990s. Competing in two Summer Olympics, she won two medals at Barcelona in 1992 with a gold in the K-4 500 m and a bronze in the K-2 500 m events.

Dónusz also won twelve medals at the ICF Canoe Sprint World Championships with a gold (K-4 200 m: 1994), eight silvers (K-2 500 m: 1989, 1990, 1991; K-2 5000 m: 1990, 1993; K-4 500 m: 1990, 1991, 1994), and three bronzes (K-1 200 m: 1998, K-4 500 m: 1993, 1995).

Awards
   Order of Merit of the Republic of Hungary – Small Cross (1992)
 Hungarian kayaker of the Year (1): 1992
 Member of the Hungarian team of year (with Rita Kőbán, Erika Mészáros, Kinga Czigány): 1992

References

External links 
 

1967 births
Canoeists at the 1992 Summer Olympics
Canoeists at the 1996 Summer Olympics
Hungarian female canoeists
Living people
Olympic canoeists of Hungary
Olympic gold medalists for Hungary
Olympic bronze medalists for Hungary
Olympic medalists in canoeing
ICF Canoe Sprint World Championships medalists in kayak
Medalists at the 1992 Summer Olympics
20th-century Hungarian women